Koepka is a surname. Notable people with the surname include:

Brooks Koepka (born 1990), American golfer
Chase Koepka (born 1994), American golfer

See also
Kepka (surname)